The 2014 Copa Venezuela was the 45th staging of the Copa Venezuela. The winner qualified for the 2015 Copa Sudamericana.

Preliminary round
Teams entering this round: 8 teams from Venezuelan Segunda División.
First legs: August 5, 6; Second legs: August 13.

|}

First round
Teams entering this round: 16 teams from Venezuelan Primera División, 8 teams from Venezuelan Segunda División.
First legs: August 13, 20, 21, September 3; Second legs: September 6, 7.

|-
!colspan=5|Central & Oriental Group

|-
!colspan=5|Central & Occidental Group

|}

Round of 16
Teams entering this round: Caracas FC (2013 Copa Venezuela champion), Zamora FC (2012–13 Venezuelan Primera División champion).
First legs: September 17, October 1; Second legs: October 1, 8.

|-
!colspan=5|Central & Oriental Group

|-
!colspan=5|Central & Occidental Group

|}

Quarterfinals
First legs: October 12; Second legs: October 22

|-
!colspan=5|Central & Oriental Group

|-
!colspan=5|Central & Occidental Group

|}

Semifinals
First legs: November 5; Second legs: November 16

|-
!colspan=5|Central & Oriental Group

|-
!colspan=5|Central & Occidental Group

|}

Final
First leg: November 26; Second leg: December 3

|}

References

External links
Official website of the Venezuelan Football Federation 
Copa Venezuela 2014, Soccerway.com

Copa Venezuela
Venezuela
2014–15 in Venezuelan football